Fleur van der Weel (born 9 February 1970) is a Dutch illustrator.

Career 
In 2004, Van der Weel and Edward van de Vendel won the Woutertje Pieterse Prijs for their book Superguppie (2003). She also received the Vlag en Wimpel award for her illustrations in this book. In the years that followed, both published several other books in the Supperguppie book series. In 2012, they both also published the book Hallo, a picture book on the occasion of the Kinderboekenweek.

Van der Weel has illustrated books by various Dutch authors, including Bibi Dumon Tak, Fiona Rempt, Magda Ria Rapoye and Rindert Kromhout.

Awards 
 2004: Woutertje Pieterse Prijs, Superguppie (with Edward van de Vendel)
 2004: Vlag en Wimpel, Superguppie

References

External links 
 
 Fleur van der Weel (in Dutch), Digital Library for Dutch Literature

1970 births
Living people
Dutch illustrators
Dutch women illustrators
Dutch children's book illustrators
20th-century Dutch women artists
21st-century Dutch women artists
Woutertje Pieterse Prize winners